The 1916 VPI Gobblers football team represented the Virginia Agricultural and Mechanical College and Polytechnic Institute in the 1916 college football season. Led by Jack E. Ingersoll in his only year as head coach, the team went 7–2 and claims a South Atlantic Intercollegiate Athletic Association (SAIAA) championship.

Schedule

Players
The following players were members of the 1916 football team according to the roster published in the 1917 edition of The Bugle, the Virginia Tech yearbook.

Game summaries

Richmond
The starting lineup for VPI was: Nelson (left end), Parrish (left tackle), Howell (left guard), A. B. Moore (center), A. P. Moore (right guard), Caffee (right tackle), Younger (right end), Lancaster (quarterback), Gaines (left halfback), Mack (right halfback), Redd (fullback). The substitutes were: Engleby, Funkhouser, Gregory, Hall, McNeil, D. Roden, E. Roden, Somerville, Stringer and Treakle.

Hampden–Sydney
The starting lineup for VPI was: Gregory (left end), Hall (left tackle), Howell (left guard), A. B. Moore (center), A. P. Moore (right guard), Caffee (right tackle), Nelson (right end), Lancaster (quarterback), Stringer (left halfback), Mack (right halfback), Redd (fullback). The substitutes were: E. Roden, Somerville and Younger.

West Virginia
The starting lineup for VPI was: Younger (left end), Hall (left tackle), Howell (left guard), A. P. Moore (center), A. B. Moore (right guard), Caffee (right tackle), Nelson (right end), Funkhouser (quarterback), Gaines (left halfback), Stringer (right halfback), Redd (fullback). The substitutes were: Gregory, McNeil, Parrish, E. Roden and Treakle.

Yale
Former President and future Chief Justice William Howard Taft attended the Yale-VPI game to watch his son Charles play in the game.

The starting lineup for VPI was: Gregory (left end), Hall (left tackle), Parrish (left guard), A. P. Moore (center), A. B. Moore (right guard), Caffee (right tackle), Younger (right end), E. Roden (quarterback), Mack (left halfback), Nelson (right halfback), Gardner (fullback). The substitutes were: Funkhouser, McNeil, Redd and D. Roden.

North Carolina A&M
The starting lineup for VPI was: Gregory (left end), Parrish (left tackle), Treakle (left guard), A. B. Moore (center), A. P. Moore (right guard), Caffee (right tackle), Younger (right end), E. Roden (quarterback), Funkhouser (left halfback), Nelson (right halfback), Redd (fullback). The substitutes were: Gaines, Gardner, Howell, Lancaster, McNeil, Palmer, G. Parrish, Pritchard, D. Roden, Somerville, Stringer and Turber.

North Carolina
The starting lineup for VPI was: Gregory (left end), Hall (left tackle), Parrish (left guard), A. B. Moore (center), A. P. Moore (right guard), Caffee (right tackle), Younger (right end), Lancaster (quarterback), Nelson (left halfback), Gardner (right halfback), Redd (fullback). The substitutes were: Funkhouser, Gaines, Howell and E. Roden.

Wake Forest
The starting lineup for VPI was: Gregory (left end), Hall (left tackle), Howell (left guard), A. B. Moore (center), Parrish (right guard), Caffee (right tackle), Younger (right end), E. Roden (quarterback), Gardner (left halfback), Nelson (right halfback), Redd (fullback). The substitutes were: D. Roden and Stringer.

Roanoke
The starting lineup for VPI was: Gregory (left end), Hall (left tackle), Parrish (left guard), A. B. Moore (center), Howell (right guard), Caffee (right tackle), Younger (right end), E. Roden (quarterback), Gardner (left halfback), Nelson (right halfback), Redd (fullback). The substitutes were: Funkhouser, Lancaster, McNeil and Stringer.

VMI
The starting lineup for VPI was: Gregory (left end), Hall (left tackle), Parrish (left guard), A. B. Moore (center), A. P. Moore (right guard), Caffee (right tackle), Younger (right end), E. Roden (quarterback), Gaines (left halfback), Nelson (right halfback), Redd (fullback). The substitutes were: Funkhouser, Howell, Lancaster, McNeil, Reimer, Somerville and Stringer.

References

VPI
Virginia Tech Hokies football seasons
South Atlantic Intercollegiate Athletic Association football champion seasons
VPI Gobblers football